John Drayton Mahaffey Jr. (born May 9, 1948) is an American professional golfer who has won numerous tournaments including 10 PGA Tour events.

Mahaffey was born in Kerrville, Texas. He attended the University of Houston in Houston, Texas. He turned pro in 1971 after graduating in 1970 with a degree in psychology.

Mahaffey came close to winning back to back U.S. Opens. In 1975 he lost in a playoff to Lou Graham at the Medinah Country Club in Medinah, Illinois. The following year Mahaffey had a two-shot lead after 54 holes at the Atlanta Athletic Club in Johns Creek, Georgia before shooting a final round 73 and finishing T4th.

In 1978 he won twice on the tour including one major, the PGA Championship. He also won the World Cup individual and team event where he was paired with Andy North in 1978.

The 1978 PGA championship was held at Oakmont Country Club in Oakmont, Pennsylvania. Mahaffey became the best comeback winner in PGA history after trailing Tom Watson by seven strokes with 14 holes to play. Ultimately, the tournament came down to a three-player playoff – Mahaffey, Watson and Jerry Pate. All three players made par on the first playoff hole. The drama ended on the second playoff hole when Pate missed the green, Watson missed a 30-foot birdie attempt and Mahaffey made his 12-foot birdie putt for the Championship.

Mahaffey played on the 1979 Ryder Cup team.

Mahaffey lives near Houston at The Woodlands in his home state of Texas. His family includes wife Elizabeth, and two children. He works as a announcer on Golf Channel telecasts of the PGA Tour Champions.

Amateur wins
1970 NCAA Championship

Professional wins (16)

PGA Tour wins (10)

PGA Tour playoff record (3–2)

Other wins (5)

Senior PGA Tour wins (1)

Senior PGA Tour playoff record (1–1)

Major championships

Wins (1)

1Defeated Pate and Watson with a birdie on the second extra hole.

Results timeline

LA = Low amateur
CUT = missed the halfway cut
WD = Withdrew
"T" indicates a tie for a place.

Summary

Most consecutive cuts made – 8 (1978 PGA – 1981 Masters)
Longest streak of top-10s – 2 (1975 U.S. Open – 1975 Open Championship)

The Players Championship

Wins (1)

Results timeline

CUT = missed the halfway cut
"T" indicates a tie for a place.

U.S. national team appearances
Professional
Ryder Cup: 1979 (winners)
World Cup: 1978 (winners, individual winner), 1979 (winners)
Nissan Cup: 1986

See also
1971 PGA Tour Qualifying School graduates
List of men's major championships winning golfers

References

External links

American male golfers
Houston Cougars men's golfers
PGA Tour golfers
PGA Tour Champions golfers
Ryder Cup competitors for the United States
Winners of men's major golf championships
Golf writers and broadcasters
Golfers from Houston
People from Kerrville, Texas
1948 births
Living people